Anna-Maria Rieder (born 2 February 2000) is a German para alpine skier who competed at the 2018 and 2022 Winter Paralympics.

Career
Rieder made her international debut at the 2017 World Para Alpine Skiing Championships and won a bronze medal in the slalom standing event.

She represented Germany at the 2018 Winter Paralympics and finished in sixth place in the giant slalom event.

She again represented Germany at the 2022 Winter Paralympics, and won a bronze medal in the slalom standing event. She also finished in fourth place in the super combined, and fifth place in the Super-G and giant slalom events.

References

External links
 
 

2000 births
Living people
German female alpine skiers
Paralympic medalists in alpine skiing
Paralympic bronze medalists for Germany
Alpine skiers at the 2018 Winter Paralympics
Alpine skiers at the 2022 Winter Paralympics
Medalists at the 2022 Winter Paralympics